Luisia tristis, commonly known as the velvet orchid, is a species of epiphytic or lithophytic orchid with wiry stems often forming tangled clumps, cylindrical leaves and flowering stems with up to three green flowers with a dark red to dark maroon labellum. This orchid occurs in tropical Asia, New Guinea, Australia and some islands of the Western Pacific Ocean.

Description
There is an oblong hyopchile at the base of the labellum and a heart-shaped upper epichile. Flowering occurs from November to April.

Taxonomy and naming
The velvet orchid was first formally described in 1786 by Georg Forster who gave it the name Epidendrum triste and published the description in Florulae Insularum Australium Prodromus. In 1890 Joseph Dalton Hooker changed the name to Luisia tristis. The specific epithet (tristis) is a Latin word meaning "sad".

Distribution and habitat
The velvet orchid usually grows on rough-barked trees in well lit rainforest. It is found in southern Taiwan, the Lesser Sunda Islands, the Maluku Islands, the Philippines, Guam, New Guinea, the Solomon Islands, Fiji, New Caledonia, Samoa, Vanuatu and Australia. In Australia it occurs in the Northern Territory including Melville Island and on some Torres Strait Islands and the Cape York Peninsula in Queensland as far south as the Daintree River.

References

tristis
Orchids of Australia
Orchids of New Guinea
Orchids of the Philippines
Orchids of Taiwan
Orchids of Indonesia
Plants described in 1786